Studio Universal is a specialty television channel focused on films, owned by Universal Networks International. The programming is based on films (mainly from Universal Studios movies catalogue) and related programs with interviews, insights, short films and frequent themed nights or seasons in which are shown a number of films centred on one genre, director or actor. The Studio Universal brand has been chosen as one of core channels of Universal Networks International. The channel was launched on February 1, 2010 in Latin America replacing Hallmark Channel.

History

Originally first launched in Italy in 1998 and available on satellite pay-television platform Stream TV and continued on SKY Italia from July 31, 2003 to June 1, 2008, when for a carriage dispute the channel has been dropped and replaced by MGM Channel. The Studio Universal channel has been resumed later on May 8, 2009, on Premium Gallery, part of pay-television platform Mediaset Premium.

It was announced in November, 2008 by Steve Patscheck, director of "Universal Networks Latin America", that the channel would be launched in Latin America on February 1, 2010 replacing The Hallmark Channel in the region. Studio Universal has since been launched (August, 2011) in South Africa and sub-saharan Africa.

Programming

Latin America
 Fairly Legal
 Nurse Jackie
 Psych (seasons 5-8)
 Ringer
 Smash (only season 2)
 The Good Wife (seasons 4-5, seasons 1-3 and 6 air on Universal Channel)
 Monk (repeats)

Greece
30 Rock
Beauty & the Beast 
Brooklyn Nine-Nine
Chicago Med
Fairly Legal 
Grimm 
House
Hung
Law & Order: Special Victims Unit
Life Unexpected 
Modern Family
Nurse Jackie
Psych
Rookie Blue
Smash
Suits

Bulgaria
Alias
Arrow
Boston Legal
Burn Notice
Cagney & Lacey
Castle
Criminal Minds
CSI: Miami
CSI: New York
Da Vinci’s Inquest 
Deception
Eureka
Fairly Legal
Flashpoint
Grimm
Haven
House
In Plain Sight
JAG
Kidding
Law & Order 
Law & Order: Criminal Intent 
Law & Order: Los Angeles
Law & Order: Special Victims Unit 
Law & Order: Trial by Jury
Monk
Motive
Nash Bridges 
New York Undercover
Prison Break
Psych
Rookie Blue 
Royal Pains 
Saving Grace 
Shattered
Smash
The Closer
The Event
The Flash 
The Good Guys 
The Good Wife 
The Librarians
The Listener
The Mentalist
The Real Housewives of Atlanta
Walker, Texas Ranger
Without a Trace

Romania 
Army Wives 
Big Brother USA
Big Brother Australia
Big Brother Israel
Big Brother UK
Chicago Fire 
Chicago Med 
Chicago P.D.
Devious Maids 
The Good Wife 
Law & Order 
Law & Order: Criminal Intent 
Law & Order: Special Victims Unit 
Law & Order: Trial by Jury
Law & Order: UK
Limitless
Major Crimes
Medium
Nurse Jackie 
Psych
Rookie Blue
Royal Pains
The Real Housewives of New York City 
The Real Housewives of Orange County 
The Real Housewives of Salt Lake City 
Up All Night 
White Collar 
Whitney

Russia 

 Bates Motel 
 Chicago Fire 
 Cold Case 
 Drop Dead Diva
 Extant
 Fairly Legal 
 The Good Wife 
 House
 In Plain Sight
 Last Resort 
 Law & Order 
 Law & Order: CI
 Law & Order: LA
 Law & Order: SVU 
 The Mentalist
 Monk
 NCIS
 NUMB3RS
 Nurse Jackie
 Perception 
 Psych
 Rizzoli & Isles 
 Rookie Blue 
 Up All Night 
 Whitney

See also
Studio Universal (Latin America)
Studio Universal (Poland)
Studio Universal (South America)
Studio Universal (Italy)
Studio Universal (Bulgaria)
Studio Universal (Germany)

References

External links
Official Italian website 
Official Latin America website
Official South Africa website

Universal Networks International
Movie channels
Television channels and stations established in 1998
Italian-language television stations